Sunset Boulevard is a celebrated street in western Los Angeles County, California.

Sunset Boulevard may also refer to:

Other places
 Sunset Boulevard, a district of the Disney's Hollywood Studios
 Sunset Boulevard, a thoroughfare running north–south through the Sunset District of San Francisco, California

Film
 Sunset Boulevard (film), a 1950 film starring Gloria Swanson and William Holden
 Sunset Boulevard (film score), the score for the 1950 film
 Sunset Boulevard (musical), an Andrew Lloyd Webber musical adapted from the film

Music
 "Sunset Blvd" (song), a song by Scott Grimes
 "Sunset Boulevard", a song from the album City Boy by City Boy
 Sunset Blvd. (album), Yancey Boys album
 Sunset Blvd, a 2007 album by Pacific!
 Sunset Boulevard EP, 1994 release by Luke Vibert